A digital wallet, also known as an e-wallet, is an electronic device, online service, or software program that allows one party to make electronic transactions with another party bartering digital currency units for goods and services. This can include purchasing items either online or at the point of sale in a brick and mortar store, using either mobile payment (on a smartphone or other mobile device) or (for online buying only) using a laptop or other personal computer. Money can be deposited in the digital wallet prior to any transactions or, in other cases, an individual's bank account can be linked to the digital wallet. Users might also have their driver's license, health card, loyalty card(s) and other ID documents stored within the wallet. The credentials can be passed to a merchant's terminal wirelessly via near field communication (NFC). 

Increasingly, digital wallets are being made not just for basic financial transactions but to also authenticate the holder's credentials. For example, a digital wallet could verify the age of the buyer to the store while purchasing alcohol. The system has already gained popularity in Japan, where digital wallets are known as "wallet mobiles". 

A cryptocurrency wallet is a digital wallet where private keys are stored for cryptocurrencies like bitcoin.

Technology
A digital wallet has both a software and information component. Secure and fair electronic payment systems are important issue. The software provides security and encryption for the personal information and for the actual transaction. Typically, digital wallets are stored on the client side and are easily self-maintained and fully compatible with most e-commerce websites. A server-side digital wallet, also known as a thin wallet, is one that an organization creates for and about you and maintains on its servers. Server-side digital wallets are gaining popularity among major retailers due to the security, efficiency, and added utility it provides to the end-user, which increases their satisfaction of their overall purchase. The information component is basically a database of user-input information. This information consists of your shipping address, billing address, payment methods (including credit card numbers, expiry dates, and security numbers), and other information.

Digital wallets are composed of both digital wallet devices and digital wallet systems. There are dedicated digital wallet devices such as the biometric wallet by Dunhill, a physical device that holds cash and cards along with a Bluetooth mobile connection. Presently there are further explorations for smartphones with NFC digital wallet capabilities, such as smartphones utilizing Google's Android and Apple's iOS operating systems to power wallets such as Google Pay and Apple Pay.

Digital wallet systems enable the widespread use of digital wallet transactions among various retail vendors in the form of mobile payments systems and digital wallet applications. The M-PESA mobile payments system and microfinancing service has widespread use in Kenya and Tanzania, while the MasterCard PayPass application has been adopted by a number of vendors in the U.S. and worldwide.

Digital wallets are being used more frequently among Asian countries as well. One in every five consumers in Asia are now using a digital wallet, representing a twofold increase from two years ago. A MasterCard mobile shopping survey among 8500 adults, aged 18–64 across 14 markets, showed that 45% of users in China, 36.7% of users in India and 23.3% of users in Singapore are the biggest adopters of digital wallets. The survey was conducted between October and December 2015. Further analysis showed that 48.5% of consumers in these regions made purchases using smartphones. Indian consumers are leading the way with 76.4% using a smartphone to make a purchase, which is a drastic increase of 29.3% from the previous year. This has inspired companies like Reliance and Amazon India to come out with their own digital wallet. Flipkart has already introduced its own digital wallet.

Security

Consumers are not required to fill out order forms on each site when they purchase an item because the information has already been stored and is automatically updated and entered into the order fields across merchant sites when using a digital wallet. Consumers also benefit when using digital wallets because their information is encrypted or protected by a private software code; merchants benefit by receiving a combination of protection against fraud, faster receipt of payment, decreased transaction costs, and decreased theft loss.

Digital wallets are available to consumers free of charge, and they're fairly easy to obtain. For example, when a consumer makes a purchase at a merchant site that's set up to handle server-side digital wallets, they type their name, payment and shipping information into the merchant's own form. At the end of the purchase, the consumer is asked to sign up for a wallet of their choice by entering a user name and password for future purchases. Users can also acquire wallets at a wallet vendor's site.

Although a wallet is free for consumers, vendors charge merchants for wallets. Some wallet vendors make arrangements for merchants to pay them a percentage of every successful purchase directed through their wallets. In other cases, digital wallet vendors process the transactions between cardholders and participating merchants and charge merchants a flat fee.

See also

 Universal credit card
 Cryptocurrency wallet

References

External links
 : ECML specification

Digital currencies
Payment systems